This is a list of the French SNEP Top 100 Singles, Top 50 Downloads and Top 150 albums number-ones of 2006.

Number-one by week

Singles chart

Albums chart

Top ten best sales
This is the ten best-selling singles and albums in 2006.

Singles

Albums

See also
2006 in music
List of number-one hits (France)
List of artists who reached number one on the French Singles Chart

References

2006 in French music
France
2006